The discography of American singer Richie Sambora includes three released studio albums and fourteen singles.

Albums

Studio albums

Singles

Other album appearances

References

Alternative rock discographies
Discographies of American artists